Guadalupe Nettel (born 1973) is a Mexican writer. She has published four novels, including The Body Where I Was Born (2011) and After the Winter (2014). She won the Premio de Narrativa Breve Ribera del Duero and the Premio Herralde literary awards. She has been a contributor to Granta, The White Review, El País, The New York Times, La Repubblica and La Stampa. Her works have been translated to 17 languages. She is the  editor of the Revista de la Universidad de México, the oldest cultural magazine in Mexico.

Life
Guadalupe Nettel was born in Mexico City and spent part of her childhood in the south of France. From a young age she suffered from eye problems due to a congenital condition in one of her eyes, probably Peters' syndrome. She was consequently a victim of bullying, a fact that, according to Nettel, was one of the reasons that led her to take refuge in books and start writing. She obtained a PhD in linguistics from the École des Hautes Études en Sciences Sociales in Paris. Her work has been translated to more than 17 languages. She is a contributor to various magazines and publications including as Granta, El País, The New York Times, La Repubblica and La Stampa. She is the editor of the Revista de la Universidad de México of the National Autonomous University of Mexico (UNAM).

She has published in several genres, both fiction and non-fiction. Her collection of short stories El matrimonio de los peces rojos won the Premio Internacional de Narrativa Breve Ribera del Duero and has since been translated into English under the title Natural Histories. She won the Premio Herralde in 2014 for her novel Después del invierno (After the Winter).

In 2007, she was named as one of the Bogotá 39, a list of the most promising young Latin American writers under the age of thirty-nine announced at the Hay Festival Bogota.

She has published three English-language works of fiction with Seven Stories Press: Natural Histories (2014), The Body Where I was Born (2015)., and Bezoar And Other Unsettling Stories (2020). The Body Where I Was Born was recognized  on the Three Percent Best Translated Book Longlist and as a Neustadt International Prize for Literature Finalist.

Bibliography 
Novels
 El huésped, Editorial Anagrama, 2006, 
 El cuerpo en que nací, Editorial Anagrama, 2011, 

 Después del invierno, Anagrama, 2014, 

 La hija única, Editorial Anagrama, 2020, 
 Still Born, Fitzcarraldo Editions, Translated by Harvey, Rosalind, 2022, 

Stories
 Les jours fossiles, Translated Marianne Millon, L'éclose éditions, 2002, 
 Pétalos y otras historias incómodas, Editorial Anagrama, 2008, 
 El matrimonio de los peces rojos, Páginas de Espuma, 2013, 
 Natural Histories, translated by J. T. Lichtenstein, Seven Stories Press, 2014, 
 Bezoar And Other Unsettling Stories, translated by Suzanne Jill Levine, Seven Stories Press, 2020, 

Essays
 Para entender a Julio Cortázar, Nostra Ediciones, 2008,

Awards and recognition 
Longlisted for the International Booker Prize (2023) for Still Born
Shortlisted for the Oxford-Weidenfeld Translation Prize (2021)
Recipient of the Borchard Foundation Literary Fellowship (2021)
Winner of the Cálamo Prize (2020)
Finalist for the Neustadt International Prize for Literature (2016)
Winner of the XXXII Premio Herralde de Novela (2014) for After the Winter
 Winner of the III Premio de Narrativa Breve Ribera del Duero (2013) 
Winner of the Anna Seghers Prize (2009)
Winner of the Gilberto Owen National Prize of Literature (2008)
Winner of the jeunes Alliance française prize (1992)

References

Further reading

External links

 Official website
Best Untranslated Writers: Guadalupe Nettel, Granta
The Fantastic Is Always Possible: A Q&A with Guadalupe Nettel, Brazos
An Interview with Guadalupe Nette, Bookslut, June 2014

Mexican women novelists
Mexican women short story writers
Mexican short story writers
1973 births
Writers from Mexico City
21st-century Mexican novelists
Living people
21st-century short story writers
21st-century Mexican women writers
Mexican literary critics
Women literary critics
National Autonomous University of Mexico alumni
School for Advanced Studies in the Social Sciences alumni